Heteroponera inermis is a species of ant in the genus Heteroponera. Endemic to Brazil, it was described by Emery in 1894.

References

Heteroponerinae
Hymenoptera of South America
Insects described in 1894